Lebanonwire was an English news portal headquartered in Beirut, Lebanon and established in 1999. It provided news about Lebanon, the Middle East and other parts of the world. It was stopped in 2015.

History
Lebanonwire was launched by Lebanon Wire Enterprise in 1999. Lebanon Wire Enterprise was also the publisher of the news portal which has an independent stance. Farid Chedid was the editor-in-chief of Lebanonwire.

Content
Lebanonwire provided latest news about Lebanon, the Middle East and the world based on nearly 3600 sources as well as in-depth analysis of the news.

References

External links
 Official website

1999 establishments in Lebanon
2015 disestablishments in Lebanon
Defunct newspapers published in Lebanon
Defunct websites
English-language websites
Lebanese news websites
Newspapers published in Beirut
Publications established in 1999
Publications disestablished in 2015
English-language newspapers published in Lebanon